Lozère is one of the four RER B station of Palaiseau, near Paris, in France, famous for being École polytechnique's station.

It serves École polytechnique through a path with approximately 300 stairs, widely known as the "path to glory" among French undergraduate students, in reference to this university's motto : " For Homeland, Science and Glory".

Other stations of Palaiseau
 
 

Réseau Express Régional stations
Railway stations in Essonne
Railway stations in France opened in 1854